The 2022–23 Egypt Cup is the 91st season of the premier knockout competition. The Egyptian Football Association oversees the Egypt Cup.

Format 
In the first and second preliminary rounds, when the match ends in a tie in normal time, extra time is not played and the winner is decided through a penalty shoot-out.

Schedule 
The schedule for the tournament stages is as follows:

Competition

First preliminary round 
The draw for the preliminary round took place on 16 October 2022. Fourth and third division clubs join in this round. 51 teams will compete, of which 25 will qualify for the next round.

Second preliminary round 
The draw took place on 30 October 2022.

Third preliminary round 
Second division clubs join in this round.

Fourth preliminary round 
The draw took place on 25 January 2023.

Round of 32 
The participation of Premier League clubs starts from this round. The matches were scheduled to take place between 16 and 20 March 2023 but later postponed due to the desire to play the last season's final first.

Qualified teams

 Al Ahly
 Alo Egypt
 Asyut Petroleum
 Ceramica Cleopatra
 Dekernes
 ENPPI
 Future
 Ghazl El Mahalla
 Al Hammam
 Haras El Hodoud
 Ismaily
 Al Ittihad
 La Vienna
 Al Masry
 El Masria Lell Etesalat
 Al Mokawloon Al Arab
 National Bank of Egypt
 Nogoom FC
 Pharco
 Proxy
 Pyramids
 Raya Ghazl Kafr Al-Dawar
 El Sekka El Hadid
 El Sharkia
 Smouha
 Suez SC
 Tala'ea El Gaish
 Tala'ea El Ustoul
 Young Muslims Qena
 Zamalek

References 

Egypt Cup
2022–23 African domestic association football cups